Andrzej Sławiński (born July 31, 1951 in Warsaw) is a Polish economist and Professor of Economics at the Warsaw School of Economics. He is a member of the Council of Monetary Policies since 2004 and a fellow of Collegium Invisibile.

He received his M.A. in economics in 1973 and Ph.D. in international finance in 1979 both from the Warsaw School of Economics.

His research work concentrates on central banks functioning, financial crises in developing economies and financial (especially derivatives) markets. Author of numerous publications. In September 2010, he was appointed to the Economic Institute of the National Bank of Poland.

References

1951 births
Living people
Academic staff of the SGH Warsaw School of Economics
Fellows of Collegium Invisibile